In Greek mythology, Larissa or Larisa (Ancient Greek: Λάρισσα) was the name of two different figures that appears in various accounts:

Larisa, daughter of Pelasgus 

Larisa was a nymph from Thessaly. She was described by Pausanias as a daughter of Pelasgus, son of Triopas, king of Argos. Hellanicus states that the sons of Poseidon and Larissa were Achaios, Phthios, and Pelasgus. These sons left Argos and arrived in Haemonia (Thessaly) where they drove out the barbarian inhabitants and divided the country into three parts, calling them, after their names, Phthiotis, Achaia and Pelasgiotis.

The arx of Argos and two towns (Larissa in Thessaly and one in the Peneus) are believed to have derived their name (meaning "citadel") from her.
She was represented on the obverse of common drachmas produced by the city of Larissa between 400 BCE and at least 340 BCE, as a three-quarters face with outward flowing hair. This style was copied from the head of Arethusa by Cimon, depicted on Syracusan tetradrachmas.  According to hoard evidence from Thessaly, this coinage was produced down to c. 320 BCE. Other coins depict Larissa seated, holding a hydria and with a spring nearby, confirming her status as a nymph.

A moon of Neptune was discovered by Harold J. Reitsema, William B. Hubbard, Larry A. Lebofsky and David J. Tholen on May 24, 1981 and later given the name Larissa. Larissa is also designated as "Neptune VII", S/1981 N 1 and "S/1989 N 2".

Larisa, daughter of Piasus 
Larissa was the daughter of the Pelasgian prince, Piasus and wife of Cyzicus, king of the Dolionians, the people of northwestern Asia Minor visited by the Argonauts. Strabo reported that "before her marriage, her father Piasus fell in love with her and, having violated her, paid the penalty for the outrage; on that account Larisa, observing him leaning over a cask of wine, seized him by the legs, raised him, and plunged him into the cask, drowning him."

See also
Elara (mythology)

Notes

References 
 
 Dionysus of Halicarnassus, Roman Antiquities. English translation by Earnest Cary in the Loeb Classical Library, 7 volumes. Harvard University Press, 1937-1950. Online version at Bill Thayer's Web Site
Dionysius of Halicarnassus, Antiquitatum Romanarum quae supersunt, Vol I-IV. . Karl Jacoby. In Aedibus B.G. Teubneri. Leipzig. 1885. Greek text available at the Perseus Digital Library.
Larson, Jennifer S. (2001) Greek Nymphs: Myth, Cult, Lore. Oxford, Oxford University Press. 
 Mørkholm, Otto (1991) Early Hellenistic Coinage from the Accession of Alexander to the Peace of Apamaea (336–188 BC). Cambridge, Cambridge University Press. 
Parthenius, Love Romances translated by Sir Stephen Gaselee (1882-1943), S. Loeb Classical Library Volume 69. Cambridge, MA. Harvard University Press. 1916.  Online version at the Topos Text Project.
Parthenius, Erotici Scriptores Graeci, Vol. 1. Rudolf Hercher. in aedibus B. G. Teubneri. Leipzig. 1858. Greek text available at the Perseus Digital Library.
Pausanias, Description of Greece with an English Translation by W.H.S. Jones, Litt.D., and H.A. Ormerod, M.A., in 4 Volumes. Cambridge, MA, Harvard University Press; London, William Heinemann Ltd. 1918. . Online version at the Perseus Digital Library
Pausanias, Graeciae Descriptio. 3 vols. Leipzig, Teubner. 1903.  Greek text available at the Perseus Digital Library.
 Smith, William (1849) Dictionary of Greek and Roman Biography and Mythology.
Strabo, The Geography of Strabo. Edition by H.L. Jones. Cambridge, Mass.: Harvard University Press; London: William Heinemann, Ltd. 1924. Online version at the Perseus Digital Library.
Strabo, Geographica edited by A. Meineke. Leipzig: Teubner. 1877. Greek text available at the Perseus Digital Library.

External links
 LarissaTora.com A website about the prefecture of larissa with the coin image in its banner (contains some information about the mythological Nymph named Larissa also).
 Silver coin with head of Larissa

Nymphs
Queens in Greek mythology
Larissa
Mythology of Argolis
Mythological rape victims
Incest in Greek mythology
Incestual abuse